The 2017 National Rugby Championship was the fourth season of Australia's National Rugby Championship. It involved nine professional rugby union teams, one more than the previous year, with eight teams from Australia and one team from Fiji.

The deciding match, played at Viking Park in Canberra, was won 42–28 by Queensland Country to claim their first NRC title.

Teams 
A major change made for the 2017 season was the inclusion of the Fijian Drua in the competition. Fijian Prime Minister Frank Bainimarama met with the Australian Rugby Union, and World Rugby earlier in the year about establishing a pathway for developing Fijian rugby players. World Rugby financed the Fijian Drua.

The nine teams for the season included three from New South Wales, two from Queensland, and one each from Australian Capital Territory, Victoria, Western Australia, and Fiji:

Home match venues scheduled for the 2017 NRC season:

Television coverage and streaming 
Two of the NRC matches each weekend were broadcast live via Fox Sports, with the remaining matches shown on the Fox Sports streaming platform. Discussion of the NRC competition was included on Fox Sports' review show NRC Extra Time on Monday nights, and the Kick & Chase program on Tuesday evenings.

Experimental Law Variations
The trialed changes to the point scoring system adopted in previous years were not continued for the 2017 NRC season, and scoring reverted to the standard values of five points for a try, two for a conversion and three for a penalty or drop goal.

The remaining law variations used in 2016 were retained for the 2017 season. Also adopted were World Rugby's six amendments to the program of trial laws for 2017, relating to the tackle/ruck (Law 15.4 (c), 16, and 16.4 variations) and scrum (Law 20, 20.5 (d), and  20.9 (b) variations).

Regular season 
The nine teams played in a round-robin for the regular season, each team having four matches at home and four away. The top four teams qualified for the semi-finals with the respective winner meeting in the final.

During this section of the competition, teams also played for the Horan-Little Shield, a challenge trophy put on the line when a challenge is accepted by the holders or mandated by the terms of competition for the shield.

Points for the regular season standings were accumulated by the same method as for The Rugby Championship and Super Rugby. A slightly modified version of the standard competition points system was used, with a bonus point awarded to a winning team scoring at least 3 tries more than their opponent; and a bonus point awarded to a losing team defeated by a margin of 7 points or under. Four points were awarded for a win and none for a loss; two points were awarded to each team if a match was drawn.

Each team's placement was based on its cumulative points total, including any bonus points earned. For teams level on table points, tiebreakers apply in the following order:
 Difference between points for and against during the season.
 Head-to-head match result(s) between the tied teams.
 Total number tries scored during the season.

The top four teams at the end of the regular season qualified for the title play-offs in the form of semi-finals followed by a final to determine the champion team.

Standings

Competition rounds
All kick-offs listed are in local time.

Round 1

Round 2

Round 3

Round 4

Round 5

Round 6 
Pasifika Round

Round 7

Round 8

Round 9

Finals
The top four sides in the regular season advanced to the semifinals of the knock-out stage, which was followed by the final to decide the National Rugby Championship title.

Semi-finals

Final

References

External links
NRC on Fox Sports
NRC Live on twitter.com

Team webpages

2017 in Australian rugby union
2017 rugby union tournaments for clubs
2017 National Rugby Championship
2017 in Fijian rugby union